Myanmar Extended-B is a Unicode block containing Burmese script characters for writing Pali and Tai Laing.

History
The following Unicode-related documents record the purpose and process of defining specific characters in the Myanmar Extended-B block:

References 

Unicode blocks